The Pahl Peace Prize is awarded annually to outstanding individuals who have considerably and actively contributed to world peace, funded by Mr. Jochem O.W. Pahl. The annual prize was first granted in  2021 in the Principality of Liechtenstein. It comes with a monetary award of EUR 100.000 and a specifically designed gold medal.

Prize and medal 
The Pahl Peace Prize Foundation was founded in 2018 in the Principality of Liechtenstein. The purpose of the Pahl Peace Prize Foundation is the granting of an annual peace prize, consisting of a gold medal and a cash prize of up to EUR 100.000. This prize will be awarded to outstanding individuals who have considerably and actively contributed to world peace. The prize will be granted for the first time in the year 2021 in the Principality of Liechtenstein.

Background 
The Pahl Peace Prize symbolizes the lifetime achievements of Mr. Jochem O.W. Pahl. He was always striving to make a difference – for humanity and world peace. During his world-wide travels, he had seen much misfortune, motivating him to contribute to a better world during his lifetime: “Every human, regardless of race, color, religion or education has a right to appreciation and esteem.” He bequeathed his whole estate to the Foundation and instructed in his will the Pahl Peace Prize to honor and support individuals who have contributed to world peace in an extraordinary manner.

Award Winners

References

External links 
 Official Website

Awards established in 2021
International awards
Peace awards
Liechtenstein awards